Dinan, in Iran, may refer to:
 Dinan, Isfahan
 Dinan, Mazandaran